Albert Tarantola was a Spanish-born physicist (Barcelona, June 15, 1949 – December 6, 2009), of the University of Paris and the Institut de Physique du Globe (IPGP), and author of the book Probabilistic Formulation of Inverse Problems (Tarantola, 1987, 2005). Tarantola was the leader of the Geophysical Tomography Group, that during the years 1985—2000 developed methods for the interpretation of seismic waveform data. Beyond just this field, he is widely credited with popularizing the idea that inverse problems can be interpreted in a statistical sense, yielding the Bayesian perspective of inverse problems. Apart from his scientific research, Tarantola taught both at IPGP and at other universities.

In 2018, he was given the Maurice Ewing Medal of the Society of Exploration Geophysicists, its highest award.

Notable publications

Books

Scientific articles

External links
 

2009 deaths
1949 births
Spanish physicists